Carlos Ernesto Paez de Oliveira Bustillo (born 29 May 1978) is a Honduran football midfielder who plays for Real Juventud.

Club career
Paez made his debut in the Honduran national league for Olimpia against Universidad on 5 April 2000. Until December 2009, he had scored 16 goals in total for Olimpia, Real Juventud, Real Comayagua, Real Patepluma and F.C. Motagua.

Cocaine possession
In April 2001, Paes, son of Olimpia's former Brazilian striker Ernesto Paes de Oliveira and Elvira Bustillo, was arrested by police in La Ceiba for carrying cocaine with him in his car. He denied however he had anything to do with the drugs but was sent to jail awaiting his court case. Eventually he was released and the case was never solved.

International career
Paez played for the Honduras national football team at the 2000 Summer Olympics.

He made his senior debut for Honduras in a May 2000 friendly match against Canada and has earned a total of 2 caps, scoring no goals.

His second and final international was a March 2001 friendly match against Peru.

References

External links

1978 births
Living people
Sportspeople from Tegucigalpa
Honduran people of Brazilian descent
Association football midfielders
Honduran footballers
Olympic footballers of Honduras
Footballers at the 2000 Summer Olympics
C.D. Olimpia players
F.C. Motagua players
C.D. Real Juventud players
Liga Nacional de Fútbol Profesional de Honduras players
Honduras international footballers